The Baeksang Arts Award Grand Prize – Television is an award presented annually at the Baeksang Arts Awards ceremony organised by Ilgan Sports and JTBC Plus, affiliates of JoongAng Ilbo, usually in the second quarter of each year in Seoul. It is considered the highest honor in the Television division of the ceremony. Grand Prize for Television candidates are chosen from the list of nominees in the Television division each year and are not announced prior to the ceremony. Grand Prize winner, which could be either a program or an individual, are ineligible for other major awards they are nominated for in the Television division.

Multiple wins

Winners and nominees

References

Sources

External links 
  

Baeksang Arts Awards (television)